Pirih is a Slovenian surname. Notable people with the surname include:

Metod Pirih (1936–2021), Slovenian Roman Catholic prelate
Miha Pirih (born 1978), Slovenian rower
Tomaž Pirih (born 1981), Slovenian rower, brother of Miha

See also
Pirie

Slovene-language surnames